The Federation of Welsh Anglers (FWA) is the umbrella body for the three national governing bodies for sea, coarse and game fishing in Wales – the Welsh Federation of Sea Anglers, the Welsh Federation of Coarse Anglers and the Welsh Salmon and Trout Angling Association. Founded in 2005, the FWA is responsible for the development of angling coaching in Wales.

The Federation of Welsh Anglers is based in Hirwaun, Rhondda Cynon Taf.

See also
Welsh Federation of Coarse Anglers
Welsh Federation of Sea Anglers
Welsh Salmon and Trout Angling Association

References

Sports governing bodies in Wales
Recreational fishing in Wales
2005 establishments in Wales